Baltimore S.C. is the name of two soccer clubs based in Baltimore, Maryland. One is a premier youth club formed in 2002 and the other was a member of the American Soccer League (ASL).

The original team began in 1917 under the name of the True American Club. They were the first uniformed boys' team in the state and won the junior state title in the 1920–21 season. A year later they changed their affiliation to Canton S.C. Before the 1936/37 season, the club became known as Baltimore S.C. After the 1941/42 season, the club was granted a one-year exemption from American League play. The club rejoined the league before the 1943/44 season. After the 1947/48 season, the franchise was purchased and moved to Trenton, New Jersey to become the Trenton Americans.

The current club has premier youth teams for children aging 9–18.

Results of the former Baltimore SC:

Year-by-year

References

External links
 (archived, 2009)

American Soccer League (1933–1983) teams
Soccer clubs in Baltimore
Defunct soccer clubs in Maryland
1943 establishments in Maryland
1948 disestablishments in Maryland
Association football clubs established in 1943
Association football clubs disestablished in 1948
U.S. Open Cup winners